Margarosticha plumbealis is a moth in the family Crambidae. It was described by George Hamilton Kenrick in 1912. It is found on New Guinea.

References

Acentropinae
Moths described in 1912